Hormozgan University of Medical Sciences is a public university in Bandar Abbas, Iran. The University has six faculties including medicine, dentistry, pharmacy, health care, nursing, paramedicine and two satellite schools in Minab and Bandar Lengeh.

References

External links
 "Official Website of the Hormozgan University of Medical Sciences"

Hormozgan, University of Medical Sciences
Hormozgan, University of Medical Sciences
Education in Hormozgan Province
Buildings and structures in Hormozgan Province
1987 establishments in Iran